Peptoniphilus gorbachii is a Gram-positive and anaerobic bacterium from the genus of Peptoniphilus which has been isolated from a human abscess from Los Angeles in the United States.

References 

Bacteria described in 2010
Eubacteriales